The Tochuhorn (2,661 m) is a mountain of the Swiss Pennine Alps, overlooking the Simplon Pass in the canton of Valais.

References

External links
 Tochuhorn on Hikr

Mountains of the Alps
Mountains of Switzerland
Mountains of Valais
Two-thousanders of Switzerland